James Franklin Edwards (born November 22, 1955) is a former American basketball center in the National Basketball Association (NBA) for the Los Angeles Lakers, Indiana Pacers, Cleveland Cavaliers, Phoenix Suns, Detroit Pistons, Los Angeles Clippers, Portland Trail Blazers, and Chicago Bulls. Though he never appeared in an All-Star Game, he was a reliable low-post scorer, averaging 12.7 points per game over his career. He played college basketball at the University of Washington.

Early years
Born in Seattle, Washington, Edwards starred at Roosevelt High School. As a senior in 1973, he led the Roughriders to the big-school state basketball title, while receiving All-State and All-Metro honors at center.

He also practiced cross country running as a sophomore.

College career
Edwards accepted a basketball scholarship from the hometown University of Washington, to play under coach Marv Harshman. As a freshman, he took over the starting duties at center, averaging 6.8 points and 4.6 rebounds per contest. As a sophomore, he registered 12.3 points and 7.5 rebounds per game.

As a junior in the 1975–76 season, he averaged 17.6 points (led the team) and 7.1 rebounds (second on the team) per game. He also contributed to the team having a 22–6 record, qualifying for the school's first NCAA basketball tournament appearance since 1953 and finishing the regular season ranked No. 11. This was also the last team to defeat (103–81) a John Wooden squad, as the legendary coach would retire after the season, having won his 10th National Championship.

As a senior in the 1976–1977 season, he led the team with 20.9 points and 10.4 rebounds, but the squad failed to qualify for the NCAA basketball tournament with a 17–10 overall record. He received All-American honors. He finished his college career with an average of 14.6 points and 7.5 rebounds per game.

In 1990, he was inducted into the University of Washington Husky Hall of Fame. In 2015, he was inducted into the State of Washington Sports Hall of Fame.

Professional career

Los Angeles Lakers
Edwards was selected by the Los Angeles Lakers in the 3rd round (46th overall) of the 1977 NBA draft. As a rookie, he was forced to become the team's starting center just a few minutes into the season opener against the Milwaukee Bucks, when starter Kareem Abdul-Jabbar broke his right hand in a fight with rookie Kent Benson.

He led the team with averages of 17.1 points and 8.2 rebounds per game, until Abdul-Jabbar returned after missing the first 21 contests of the season. On December 13, the Lakers needed to find a replacement for suspended power forward Kermit Washington, so Edwards was traded along with shooting guard Earl Tatum and cash considerations to the Indiana Pacers, in exchange for small forward Adrian Dantley and center Dave Robisch.

Indiana Pacers
Edwards enjoyed arguably his most productive years with the Indiana Pacers. He became the franchise's highest-scoring center, averaging 15.9 points over four seasons and also posted 7.5 rebounds per contest. The Pacers reached the playoffs for the first time in the 1980–81, under head coach Jack McKinney, and were swept 0–2 by the Philadelphia 76ers in the first round.

Cleveland Cavaliers
On May 26, 1981, he was signed as a veteran free agent by the Cleveland Cavaliers, with the Pacers receiving a 1981 second round draft pick (#36-Ray Blume) and a 1982 second round draft choice (#40-Guy Morgan) as compensation.

He spent parts of two seasons, averaging 16.0 points and 7.4 rebounds per game. On February 7, 1983, Cavaliers owner Ted Stepien desperately needed money to pay the team's payroll, so Edwards was traded along with a 1983 1st round draft pick (#21-Greg Kite) to the Phoenix Suns in exchange for power forward Jeff Cook, a 1983 1st round draft pick (#20-Roy Hinson), a 1983 3rd round draft choice (#67-Derrick Hord) and $425,000 dollars in cash.

Phoenix Suns
Edwards was a key contributor with the Phoenix Suns, averaging 14.7 points and 5.6 rebounds per game. On February 24, 1988, he was traded to the Detroit Pistons in exchange for center Ron Moore and a 1991 second-round draft pick (#46-Richard Dumas).

Detroit Pistons
Edwards played four seasons with the Detroit Pistons. He was a key reserve of the consecutive champion in 1989 and 1990 Detroit Pistons' Bad Boys squads, starting most of the team's games in 1990. He averaged 11.2 points and 3.6 rebounds as a Piston. His Fu Manchu mustache and stoic demeanor, inspired his nickname of Buddha.

On August 13, 1991, he was traded to the Los Angeles Clippers in exchange for shooting guard Jeff Martin and a 1995 2nd round draft pick (#30-Lou Roe).

Later career
Edwards spent one season in the Clippers. On August 13, 1992, he signed as an unrestricted free agent with the Los Angeles Lakers, spending two seasons with the team that drafted him.

On September 19, 1994, he signed as an unrestricted free agent with the Portland Trail Blazers. He was released on September 29, 1995.

On October 26, 1995, he signed as a free agent with the Chicago Bulls, where he won a third championship in the 19th and final season of his career in 1996, seeing limited playing time off the bench.

Edwards retired after playing 19 years at the center and power forward positions, with 14,862 career points and 6,004 career rebounds.

NBA career statistics

Regular season 

|-
| style="text-align:left;"| 
| style="text-align:left;"|L.A. Lakers
| 25 || – || 28.9 || .459 || – || .640 || 7.2 || 1.2 || 0.6 || 1.1 || 14.8
|-
| style="text-align:left;"| 
| style="text-align:left;"|Indiana
| 58 || – || 29.0 || .450 || – || .649 || 7.5 || 1.0 || 0.6 || 0.9 || 15.4
|-
| style="text-align:left;"| 
| style="text-align:left;"|Indiana
| 82 || – || 31.0 || .501 || – || .676 || 8.5 || 1.1 || 0.7 || 1.3 || 16.7
|-
| style="text-align:left;"| 
| style="text-align:left;"|Indiana
| 82 || – || 28.2 || .512 || .000 || .681 || 7.0 || 1.5 || 0.7 || 1.3 || 15.7
|-
| style="text-align:left;"| 
| style="text-align:left;"|Indiana
| 81 || – || 29.3 || .509 || .000 || .703 || 7.0 || 2.6 || 0.4 || 1.6 || 15.6
|-
| style="text-align:left;"| 
| style="text-align:left;"|Cleveland
| 77 || 75 || 33.0 || .511 || .000 || .684 || 7.5 || 1.6 || 0.3 || 1.5 || 16.7
|-
| style="text-align:left;"| 
| style="text-align:left;"|Cleveland
| 15 || 8 || 25.5 || .487 || – || .623 || 6.4 || 0.9 || 0.5 || 0.9 || 12.3
|-
| style="text-align:left;"| 
| style="text-align:left;"|Phoenix
| 16 || 1 || 17.8 || .487 || – || .660 || 3.7 || 1.7 || 0.3 || 0.3 || 8.8
|-
| style="text-align:left;"| 
| style="text-align:left;"|Phoenix
| 72 || 67 || 26.3 || .536 || .000 || .720 || 4.8 || 2.6 || 0.3 || 0.4 || 14.7
|-
| style="text-align:left;"| 
| style="text-align:left;"|Phoenix
| 70 || 58 || 25.5 || .501 || .000 || .746 || 5.5 || 2.2 || 0.4 || 0.7 || 14.9
|-
| style="text-align:left;"| 
| style="text-align:left;"|Phoenix
| 52 || 51 || 25.3 || .542 || – || .702 || 5.8 || 1.4 || 0.4 || 0.6 || 16.3
|-
| style="text-align:left;"| 
| style="text-align:left;"|Phoenix
| 14 || 9 || 21.7 || .518 || – || .771 || 4.3 || 1.4 || 0.4 || 0.5 || 12.0
|-
| style="text-align:left;"| 
| style="text-align:left;"|Phoenix
| 43 || 42 || 32.0 || .469 || .000 || .635 || 7.8 || 1.7 || 0.3 || 0.7 || 15.7
|-
| style="text-align:left;"| 
| style="text-align:left;"|Detroit
| 26 || 2 || 12.6 || .475 || – || .738 || 3.0 || 0.2 || 0.1 || 0.2 || 5.4
|-
| style="text-align:left;background:#afe6ba;"|†
| style="text-align:left;"|Detroit
| 76 || 1 || 16.5 || .500 || .000 || .686 || 3.0 || 0.6 || 0.1 || 0.4 || 7.3
|-
| style="text-align:left;background:#afe6ba;"|†
| style="text-align:left;"|Detroit
| 82 || 70 || 27.8 || .498 || .000 || .749 || 4.2 || 0.8 || 0.3 || 0.5 || 14.5
|-
| style="text-align:left;"| 
| style="text-align:left;"|Detroit
| 72 || 70 || 26.4 || .484 || .500 || .729 || 3.8 || 0.9 || 0.2 || 0.4 || 13.6
|-
| style="text-align:left;"| 
| style="text-align:left;"|L.A. Clippers
| 72 || 11 || 20.0 || .465 || .000 || .731 || 2.8 || 0.7 || 0.3 || 0.5 || 9.7
|-
| style="text-align:left;"| 
| style="text-align:left;"|L.A. Lakers
| 52 || 0 || 11.9 || .452 || – || .712 || 1.9 || 0.8 || 0.2 || 0.1 || 6.3
|-
| style="text-align:left;"| 
| style="text-align:left;"|L.A. Lakers
| 45 || 2 || 10.4 || .464 || – || .684 || 1.4 || 0.5 || 0.1 || 0.1 || 4.7
|-
| style="text-align:left;"| 
| style="text-align:left;"|Portland
| 28 || 0 || 9.5 || .386 || – || .647 || 1.5 || 0.3 || 0.2 || 0.3 || 2.7
|-
| style="text-align:left;background:#afe6ba;"|†
| style="text-align:left;"|Chicago
| 28 || 0 || 9.8 || .373 || – || .615 || 1.4 || 0.4 || 0.0 || 0.3 || 3.5
|- class="sortbottom"
| style="text-align:center;" colspan="2"| Career
| 1,168 || 467 || 24.3 || .495 || .048 || .698 || 5.1 || 1.3 || 0.4 || 0.7 || 12.7

Playoffs

|-
|style="text-align:left;"|1981
|style="text-align:left;"|Indiana
|2||–||28.0||.292||–||–||7.0||2.5||0.5||0.5||7.0
|-
|style="text-align:left;"|1983
|style="text-align:left;"|Phoenix
|3||–||18.0||.423||–||1.000||6.0||1.3||0.3||0.3||9.3
|-
|style="text-align:left;"|1984
|style="text-align:left;"|Phoenix
|17||–||27.2||.492||–||.706||5.4||1.6||0.2||0.6||13.8
|-
|style="text-align:left;"|1988
|style="text-align:left;"|Detroit
|22||2||14.0||.509||.000||.659||3.1||0.5||0.1||0.5||6.3
|-
| style="text-align:left;background:#afe6ba;"|1989†
|style="text-align:left;"|Detroit
|17||0||18.6||.471||.000||.784||2.1||0.7||0.1||0.5||7.1
|-
| style="text-align:left;background:#afe6ba;"|1990†
|style="text-align:left;"|Detroit
|20||20||26.8||.494||.000||.604||3.6||0.7||0.3||0.6||14.3
|-
|style="text-align:left;"|1991
|style="text-align:left;"|Detroit
|15||11||23.0||.407||–||.691||2.5||0.6||0.1||0.2||10.7
|-
|style="text-align:left;"|1992
|style="text-align:left;"|L.A. Clippers
|5||0||17.4||.417||–||.632||2.6||0.6||0.2||0.2||6.4
|-
|style="text-align:left;"|1993
|style="text-align:left;"|L.A. Lakers
|3||0||4.7||.750||–||–||0.7||0.0||0.0||0.0||2.0
|-
|style="text-align:left;"|1995
|style="text-align:left;"|Portland
|1||0||4.0||.000||–||–||0.0||0.0||0.0||0.0||0.0
|-
| style="text-align:left;background:#afe6ba;"|1996†
|style="text-align:left;"|Chicago
|6||0||4.7||.444||–||.750||0.7||0.0||0.0||0.0||1.8
|- class="sortbottom"
| style="text-align:center;" colspan="2"| Career
| 111 || 33 || 19.9 || .468 || .000 || .682 || 3.2 || 0.8 || 0.2 || 0.4 || 9.3

Personal life
In April 1987, Edwards, along with Jay Humphries and Grant Gondrezick, was indicted by a Maricopa County, Arizona, grand jury investigating cocaine trafficking.  Edwards was indicted on three counts, conspiracy to possess a narcotic drug, conspiracy to transfer a narcotic drug, and conspiracy to transfer or possess marijuana. Former Suns player Walter Davis was involved and was offered immunity in exchange for testimony, but his testimony failed to reveal critical details.  Edwards, along with all other defendants, never went to trial, but was required to undergo a drug counseling program as settlement.

See also
List of National Basketball Association seasons played leaders
List of oldest and youngest National Basketball Association players

References

1955 births
Living people
African-American basketball players
American men's basketball players
Basketball players from Seattle
Centers (basketball)
Chicago Bulls players
Cleveland Cavaliers players
Detroit Pistons players
Indiana Pacers players
Los Angeles Clippers players
Los Angeles Lakers draft picks
Los Angeles Lakers players
Phoenix Suns players
Portland Trail Blazers players
Power forwards (basketball)
Washington Huskies men's basketball players
21st-century African-American people
20th-century African-American sportspeople